The Great Lakes Junior C Hockey League was a Junior "C" ice hockey league in Ontario, Canada, sanctioned by the Ontario Hockey Association.  The champion of the Great Lakes competed for the All-Ontario Championship and the Clarence Schmalz Cup.  It is now a division in the Provincial Junior Hockey League.

The league got its start as the Border Cities Junior Hockey League in 1968. It became a Junior B and C league under the Great Lakes name in 1970 before strictly Junior C in 1974.

History

Development
Out of the ashes of the old Bluewater Hockey League, a local league that sometimes operated at Junior D and Juvenile levels, came the Border Cities Junior Hockey League in 1968. In 1968-69, the league operated on both sides of the Canada-United States border. The Leamington Flyers joined the league after a lackluster year in the Western Jr. B League, with the Blenheim Golden Blades, Petrolia Jets, and Dresden Jr. Kings on the Canadian side. The American teams did not participate in the OHA playoffs. Blenheim would win the Border Cities Jr. B crown with a 4-games-to-2 series win over Petrolia, while Dresden would beat Leamington 3-games-to-2 with 2 ties for the Junior C crown.

In 1969-70, the league operated as two different, but interlocked, identities - the Border Cities League and the Michigan Junior Hockey League. The Canadian teams stayed with the BCJHL and added a fifth member - the Tilbury Bluebirds. Petrolia was named Junior B champions at the end of the year, uncontested, and went on to the Sutherland Cup playdowns, while Leamington beat Dresden for the Junior C championship, and Blenheim beat Tilbury for a Junior D title.

During the summer, the league opted to separate from its Michigan brethren, who went on to form their own league. The league received an offer from a new team, the Windsor Royals. In the Fall of 1970, the league renamed itself the Great Lakes Junior Hockey League.

Great Lakes
The 1970-71 season, the first as the Great Lakes Junior Hockey League, saw the league operating with six teams. Four of the teams in the league had opted for a Junior B designation for the playoffs: Blenheim, Petrolia, Tilbury and Windsor; Dresden and Leamington remained Junior C. Petrolia would take the league Junior B crown with a dominant series victory over the upstart Royals, while the Dresden Jr. Kings went the distance and shocked the Leamington Flyers (who had finished the season with ten more wins). Dresden would go on to defeat the Central Ontario Junior C Hockey League's Champion, Bowmanville Red Eagles to win the league's first ever Provincial Championship.

In the Summer of 1971, the league expanded again with the Mooretown Flags jumping in at the Junior C level. Petrolia would defeat Windsor again at Jr. B, while Leamington gained revenge over Dresden in the Jr. C final. Leamington would manage to duplicate the deeds of the Kings in 1971, winning the 1972 OHA Junior C Championship over the Central Ontario League's Cobourg Cougars.

Before the 1972-73 season, the Petrolia Jets applied to leave the league for the Western Ontario Junior B Hockey League. They were replaced by the Sandwich West Thunderbirds of LaSalle, Ontario at the Jr. B level and the Wallaceburg Lakers in Jr. C. Windsor would win the B loop, while Leamington would again take Jr. C.

The Summer of 1973 brought more expansion. The Royals, disgruntled former affiliates of the Southern Ontario Junior A Hockey League's Windsor Spitfires were having a battle over which team deserved ascension to Major Junior A level. The Spitfires opted to not renew their agreement with the Royals and financially supported the new Belle River Bulldogs. They were joined by the soon-to-be powerhouse Essex 73's and Michigan Yankees of Utica, Michigan. Sandwich West did not return for a second season. Windsor walked through Tilbury and Belle River with no problem to win their second straight Jr. B title. Essex would shock everyone in the league and finish with the best record, but fell in the Jr. C finals to the Leamington Flyers.

In the Summer of 1974, the Royals were relocated to the Western Ontario Junior B Hockey League and the Michigan Yankees ceased operations. With half the teams gone from their already fragile Jr. B loop, the league opted to operate at Junior C from then on.

Junior C exclusive

After eliminating the Junior B level, the Great Lakes Junior C Hockey League had dropped down to eight teams for 1974-75: Belle River, Blenheim, Dresden, Essex, Leamington, Mooretown, Tilbury, and Wallaceburg. Essex, in only their second year, would win not only the regular season title (33-8-1), the playoff championship by defeating Leamington in four-straight-games, but would march their way to their first (and the GLJCHL's third) OHA Junior C Championship by defeating the Central Ontario League's Lindsay Muskies 4-games-to-3.

In 1975, Belle River Bulldogs left the league after only two seasons. Essex would win the 1975-76 regular season title, their third straight, by beating Dresden in seven games, but would fall to the Niagara & District Junior C Hockey League's Dunnville Terriers 4-games-to-2 in the provincial final.

1994 Tilbury Hawks scandal
In 1994, members of the Tilbury Hawks were charged with 135 various criminal violations by the Ontario Provincial Police stemming back to a rookie party in the Fall of 1993. Members of the Hawks organization, who won the league in 1992-93, had engaged in a rookie party at the team owner's house in which various hazing rituals were performed on rookies including forced drinking, group masturbation, shaving of pubic hair, and various sexual acts. Eventually, team trainer Paul Everaert and captain Ed Fiala pleaded guilty to their charges and were fined a total of $6,000. The team was forced out of Tilbury by the end of the 1993-94 season, relocating to Walpole Island and folding in 1999. The team was a part of an investigation and subject matter of an episode of The Fifth Estate.

Teams

2015-16 Playoffs
Winner moves on to the Clarence Schmalz Cup.

Playoff champions

Regular season champions

(*) Leamington awarded 1972-73 regular season title over Windsor Royals due to winning head-to-head record.

Former member teams

Amherstburg Vikings
Clearwater Steeplejacks
Leamington Flyers
Michigan Yankees
Petrolia Jets
Sandwich West Thunderbirds
Tilbury Bluebirds
Tilbury Hawks/Walpole Island Hawks
Windsor Royals

Professional alumni
National Hockey League
Chris Allen (Blenheim 1992-93)
Darren Banks (Leamington 1983-84)
Bob Boughner (Belle River 1986-87)
Ted Bulley (Windsor 1971-72)
Bruce Crowder (Essex 1974-75)
Keith Crowder (Essex 1975-76)
Brian Dobbin (Mooretown 1980-82)
Tie Domi (Belle River 1984-85)
Dave Gagnon (Essex 1984-85; 1985–86)
Rick Heinz (Windsor 1972-73)
Dave Kelly (Dresden 1969-70)
Kris Manery (Leamington 1972-73)
Matt Martin (Blenheim 2005-06)
Mike Natyshak (Belle River 1979-82)
Rumun Ndur (Clearwater 1991-92)
Warren Rychel (Essex 1983-84)
D. J. Smith (Belle River, Chippawa 1992-93)
Alek Stojanov (Belle River, Amherstburg 1988-89)
John Van Boxmeer (Petrolia 1970-71)
Todd Warriner (Blenheim 1988-89)
Derek Wilkinson (Belle River 1989-90)
Brian Wiseman (Dresden 1986-87)

References

External links
Great Lakes Junior C website

C
C